De Vreese is a Flemish surname. It is one of several Belgian equivalents of the much more numerous Dutch family name De Vries. Notable people with this family name include:
Alphonse De Vreese (1922–2011), French racing cyclist
Claes de Vreese (born 1974), Danish academic of Dutch origin
Laurens De Vreese (born 1988), Belgian road bicycle racer

Dutch-language surnames
Surnames of Belgian origin
Ethnonymic surnames